Sacher Park (Hebrew: גן סאקר) is the largest public park in the center of Jerusalem, near the neighborhoods of Kiryat Wolfson and Nachlaot and adjoins the Israel Government Complex.

The park was created in 1963, and named after Harry Sacher, a significant figure in the World Zionist Organization. It was designed by Yahalom Tzur, It includes lawns, walking paths, picnic areas, playgrounds, skateboard rinks, and a dog run. 
 
In April 1996, a Bonshō, a large Japanese bell, was installed in the park. It is engraved with inscriptions in Hebrew, Arabic, Japanese, and English, all containing the word “peace,” as well as an engraving of a verse from Psalms (Tehillim 122): "Pray for the peace of Jerusalem; serene will be those who love you."

Facilities 

The park has a number of facilities for its visitors, including a large playground, running track, an outdoor exercise machine area, soccer and basketball courts, drinking fountains and containers for hot barbecue coals (when you've finished with them, so as not to start a fire).

References 

Urban public parks
Parks in Jerusalem
1963 establishments in Israel